William Fletcher (1848–1918) was an English author and steam traction engine designer.

William Fletcher was a leading designer of Victorian and Edwardian steam traction engines.  some twenty of his engines survived in preservation, including Maynarch (Wallis & Steevens, 1883); Excelsior (Clayton & Shuttleworth No 34980, 1902), Peggy (Clayton & Shuttleworth, 904) and Victoria (Davey Paxman - 1907).

Many of Fletcher's original build books and drawings are held at the Museum of English Rural Life (MERL), University of Reading, Berkshire, UK.

Chronology of William Fletcher (1848 to 1918)

1848: Fletcher was born on 23 April 1848, at West Stockwith, Nottinghamshire.
1863: Apprenticeship with Marshall and Sons, Gainsborough.
1870: Draughtsman with Alexander and Sons, Cirencester.
1872: Assistant manager and chief draughtsman with Wallis & Steevens, Basingstoke.
1873: Married to Jessie Brown, daughter of a Baptist minister, Cirencester.
1874: Birth of Fletcher's 1st child; a daughter Lilian, at Basingstoke.
1876 Death of Fletcher's younger brother Robert, a gifted engineer, aged 22 years.
1877: Fletcher designed and tested Wallis & Steevens’ first steam traction engine; T250.
1878: Fletcher's 1st book, “Abuse of the steam jacket” is published. Works manager with Charles Burrell & Sons, Thetford. Birth of Fletcher's 2nd child; a son Conrad, at St. Nicholas Works, Thetford.
1880: Chief draughtsman with Marshall and Sons, Gainsborough.
1881: Birth of Fletcher's 3rd child; a daughter Hilda, at Gainsborough.
1888: Chief draughtsman with Ransomes, Sims & Jefferies, Ipswich. Fletcher re-designs all their steam traction engines and road locomotives.
1891: Fletcher's 2nd book, "The History and Development of Steam Locomotion on Common Roads” is published.
1895: Fletcher's 2nd edition of 1st book is re-printed, “The Steam Jacket Practically Considered”.
1897: Chief draughtsman with Clayton & Shuttleworth, Lincoln. Fletcher re-designs all their steam traction engines and road locomotives.
1898: Fletcher's 3rd book, “A chapter in the history of the traction engine” is published. Fletcher becomes a member of the Institution of Mechanical Engineers.
1900: Fletcher's article on the “Evolution of the Portable Engine” is published.
1904: Fletcher's 4th book, “English and American Steam Carriages and Traction Engines” is published.
1906 Chief draughtsman with Davey Paxman, Colchester. Fletcher designs all their steam traction engines.
1910: Fletcher retires from active traction and road engine design, aged sixty-two.
1911: Fletcher's article on the “Evolution of the Geared Locomotive” is published.
1918: William Fletcher dies at Cromer, Norfolk, on 22 December 1918, aged 70 years.

References

1848 births
1918 deaths
Fellows of the Institution of Mechanical Engineers
English engineers